La Familia del 6 (English title:The family of 6) is a Mexican telenovela produced by Televisa and transmitted by Telesistema Mexicano.

Miguel Ángel Ferriz and Angelines Fernández starred as protagonists.

Cast 
Miguel Ángel Ferriz
Angelines Fernández
Rafael Llamas
Graciela Doring
Raúl Macías

References 

Mexican telenovelas
1961 telenovelas
Televisa telenovelas
1961 Mexican television series debuts
1961 Mexican television series endings
Spanish-language telenovelas